The Hubli Sandbox in Hubballi, India is an ecosystem launched by Deshpande Foundation that supports mission-driven individuals to come up with sustainable and scalable enterprises having social and economic impact. It's a co-creation of Dr. Gururaj "Desh" Deshpande, Indian American venture capitalist and entrepreneur and his wife Jaishree Deshpande.

Programs 

Hubli Sandbox runs many programs in the areas of education, student leadership, agriculture, micro-entrepreneurship, and maternal health. Major programs are Sandbox Startups, Navodyami, Grantmaking & partnerships, Deshpande Educational Trust (DET), LEADers' Accelerating Development (LEAD), Agriculture, Healthcare, and Global Exchange Program.
The Development Dialogue is the annual international conference of social entrepreneurship conducted by Hubli Sandbox. NR Narayana Murthy also attended Sandbox Hubli’s Startup Dialogue 2019 event.

References

Organisations based in Karnataka
Organizations established in 2007
Development organizations
2007 establishments in Karnataka